is a Japanese manga series written and illustrated by Ukami. The series began serialization in ASCII Media Works' Dengeki Daioh G magazine in December 2013 and is licensed in English by Yen Press. An anime television adaptation by Doga Kobo aired in Japan between January and March 2017. The anime adaptation has received generally positive reviews from critics and audiences.

Plot
Upon passing a school in heaven, graduating angels are sent down to Earth, where they must learn about humans and guide them towards the correct path in order to become true angels. However, Gabriel White Tenma, the top angel in her class, becomes addicted to video games upon arriving on Earth and turns into a complete slacker as a result. The story follows Gabriel, along with other angels and demons who have descended to Earth, as they attend high school.

Characters
 

The main protagonist of the series. An angel who was the top of her class but turned into a slob after becoming addicted to video games in her attempts to help others everywhere. She is often lazy and ignores or lashes out against anyone trying to order or annoy her. Later chapters show she is still kind at heart but still lazy and gruff. She's Vigne's best friend. She sometimes calls herself a fallen angel (faillen angel in the official manga translation).
 

Gabriel's best friend and the first friend she made in the human world. The complete opposite of Gab, she is very responsible and often looks after her, contrary to her actual role as a demon. The only exception where Vigne acts demonic or threatening is to do things she enjoys, like celebrating Christmas (despite being a demon) or forcing Gabriel into a werecat costume. She also acts threatening sometimes to correct Gabriel's behaviour. She usually is supportive of Satania but isn't approving of her schemes. The manga confirms in chapter 81 that Vigne is in love with Gabriel, but is too shy to confess it.
 

An egotistical, childish, bratty demon who often thinks of weird or immature ways to cause mischief, which usually end in failure. She is often pestered by Raphi and rarely by a specific stray dog, the latter of which has stolen her beloved melon bread a few times. She is frequently not taken seriously and/or made fun of by Raphiel and Gabriel to a lesser extent, with Vigne being often her most supportive friend in things like studies. She can be easily tricked due to her incompetence and as noted by the manga, being a "total dunce". Her pranks are heavily implied to actually be motivated by loneliness rather than malice. Her parents own a bakery. Her abbreviated name Satania is romanized as Satanya in the manga english translation.
 

The second ranked angel in Gab's class, who (despite normally having a constant angelic smile) has since become a gadfly who takes delight in teasing and playing pranks, mainly on Satania. Despite this, she considers her one of her friends. Later manga chapters have Raphiel abandon her cruel traits at the beginning of the series, though she still is a teaser towards her friends. She is afraid of frogs. Raphiel also appears to have noticed Vigne's crush on Gabriel. Ukami has confirmed Raphiel has a crush on Satania.
 

An underclassman angel who admired Gab as her senpai in angel school and (wrongly) presumes Satanichia was the one responsible for turning her into a slob because of Satania's false claims. She soon meets Vignette and affectionately calls her senpai (senior) for her kindness, although she at first is shocked to find out Vigne is a demon as she thought she was an angel, she soon comes to see her as a trustworthy friend. She is naive, kind and innocent, which often bewilders her when finding new things when and makes her social life more complicated. She is by nature distrustful of demons that often don't tend to even try to be malicious... until she gets to really know them.

The class president of Gabriel's class, who is unaware that Gabriel and the rest aren't human and often finds her, along with Satania, Vignette, and Raphiel's actions bewildering. She gets upset when people don’t listen to her. 

The owner of a coffee shop where Gabriel works part time to gain extra income for her expenses. He is often bewildered by Gabriel's behavior, but assumes it is just because she is a foreigner. He is Satanichia's Landlord in the anime.

Zelel Tenma White: Gabriel's older sister.

Media

Manga
Ukami began serializing the manga series in ASCII Media Works's shōnen manga magazine Dengeki Daioh G on December 27, 2013, where it was published every other month. Starting on April 28, 2014, the series switched to monthly publication. It has been published in thirteen compiled volumes as of December 27, 2022. The series has been licensed in English by Yen Press. A spin-off series titled , which focuses on the character Tapris, began serialization in ASCII Media Works's Comic Dengeki Daioh G magazine in 2018. It is illustrated by Bafako and has been compiled into three volumes as of December 26, 2020.

Volume list

Tapris SugarStep

Anime
An anime television adaptation of the series was announced in the Dengeki Daioh magazine's September 2016 issue on July 27, 2016. The anime is produced by Doga Kobo and directed by Masahiko Ohta, with Takashi Aoshima handling series composition and Katsuhiro Kumagai designing the characters. The series aired in Japan between January 9, 2017 and March 27, 2017 and was simulcast by Crunchyroll. The first episode had an advance screening on December 18, 2016 at the Shinjuku Piccadilly theatre in Tokyo. The ending theme for episode 7 is  performed by Ōnishi. The anime ran for 12 episodes and released across three four episode BD/DVD volumes. Two original video animation episodes were released with the first and third BD/DVD volumes released on March 24, 2017 and May 24, 2017 respectively.

Episode list

Notes

References

External links
  
  
 
 

2017 anime television series debuts
2017 Japanese television series endings
Angels in television
Anime series based on manga
ASCII Media Works manga
AT-X (TV network) original programming
Comedy anime and manga
Crunchyroll anime
Demons in anime and manga
Demons in television
Doga Kobo
Kadokawa Dwango franchises
Manga adapted into television series
Manga series
Shōnen manga
Supernatural anime and manga
Tokyo MX original programming
Yen Press titles